The first season of the television series Lost commenced airing in the United States and Canada on September 22, 2004, concluded on May 25, 2005, and contained 25 episodes. It introduces the 48 survivors of a plane that broke apart in mid-air, scattering them on a remote island somewhere in the South Pacific. Forced to work together to survive, they come to realize it is no ordinary island.

The first season aired Wednesdays at 8:00 pm in the United States. In addition to the 25 regular episodes, a special, "Lost: The Journey", was aired on April 27, 2005, between the 20th and 21st episodes of the season. The season was released on DVD as a seven disc boxed set under the title of Lost: The Complete First Season on September 6, 2005, by Buena Vista Home Entertainment.

Crew 

The season was produced by Touchstone Television (now ABC Studios), Bad Robot Productions and Grass Skirt Productions and was aired on the ABC Network in the U.S. The executive producers were co-creator J. J. Abrams, co-creator Damon Lindelof, Bryan Burk, Jack Bender and Carlton Cuse with Jesse Alexander and Jeff Pinkner serving as executive consultants. The staff writers were Abrams, Lindelof, Cuse, Alexander, Pinkner, co-executive producer David Fury, supervising producer Javier Grillo-Marxuach, producer Leonard Dick, producers Edward Kitsis & Adam Horowitz, co-producer Jennifer M. Johnson and story editor Paul Dini. Some of the first season's episodes were written or co-written by writers on a freelance basis. The regular directors throughout the season were J. J. Abrams, Jack Bender, Stephen Williams, Tucker Gates, Greg Yaitanes and Kevin Hooks. Its incidental music was composed by Michael Giacchino. Abrams, Lindelof and Cuse served as the season's show runners.

Cast 

The initial season had fourteen major roles getting star billing.
 Naveen Andrews played Sayid Jarrah, a former Iraqi Republican Guard. 
 Emilie de Ravin played Claire Littleton, a pregnant Australian. Until later in the season, de Ravin is only credited for the episodes in which she appears. 
 Matthew Fox played Jack Shephard, a troubled surgeon, leader of the group, and protagonist. 
 Jorge Garcia played Hugo "Hurley" Reyes, an unlucky lottery winner. 
 Maggie Grace played Shannon Rutherford, a former dance teacher and Boone's step sister.
 Josh Holloway played James "Sawyer" Ford, a con man.
Malcolm David Kelley played Walt Lloyd, Michael's young son.
 Daniel Dae Kim played Jin-Soo Kwon, Sun-Hwa Kwon's husband. 
 Yunjin Kim played Sun-Hwa Kwon, the daughter of a powerful Korean businessman and mobster.
 Evangeline Lilly played Kate Austen, a fugitive.
 Dominic Monaghan played Charlie Pace, an ex-rock star drug addict.
 Terry O'Quinn played the mysterious John Locke.
 Harold Perrineau played Michael Dawson, a construction worker and estranged father of Walt.
 Ian Somerhalder played Boone Carlyle, chief operating officer of his mother's wedding business and step brother of Shannon. 

Numerous supporting characters have been given expansive and recurring appearances in the progressive storyline, including: L. Scott Caldwell as Rose Henderson, Mira Furlan as Danielle Rousseau, Kimberley Joseph as Cindy, Fredric Lane as Edward Mars, William Mapother as Ethan Rom, Daniel Roebuck as Leslie Arzt and John Terry as Christian Shephard. Ana Lucia Cortez, played by Michelle Rodriguez, made her first appearance this season, and she became a major character during the second season.

Reception 
On the review aggregator website Metacritic, the first season scored 87 out of 100, based on 26 reviews, indicating "Universal acclaim". On Rotten Tomatoes, the season has an approval rating of 94% with an average score of 9.4 out of 10 based on 31 reviews. The website's critical consensus reads, "Unpredictable and addictive, Lost is a new kind of TV mystery that grips as often as it guffaws."

The pilot episode garnered 18.6 million viewers, winning the 9:00 pm (Eastern) timeslot, and giving ABC its strongest ratings since 2000 when Who Wants to Be a Millionaire initially aired—beaten only the following month by the premiere of Desperate Housewives. Based on its strong opening, Reuters dubbed it a "hit drama" noting that "the show appeared to have benefited from an all-out marketing blitz that included radio spots, special screenings and ABC's first billboard advertising campaign in five years." After four episodes aired, ABC announced Lost had been picked up for a full season order. Losts first season averaged about 17.6 million American viewers.

The first season was nominated for twelve Primetime Emmy Awards. They won six: Outstanding Casting for a Drama Series, Outstanding Directing for a Drama Series (J. J. Abrams for "Pilot"), Outstanding Drama Series, Outstanding Music Composition for a Series (Dramatic Underscore) (Michael Giacchino), Outstanding Single-Camera Picture Editing for a Drama Series and Outstanding Special Visual Effects for a Series. Terry O'Quinn and Naveen Andrews received nominations for Outstanding Supporting Actor in a Drama Series. J. J. Abrams, Damon Lindelof and Jeffrey Lieber were nominated for Outstanding Writing for a Drama Series for "Pilot", with David Fury receiving a nomination in the same category for the episode "Walkabout". The series also received nominations for Outstanding Single-Camera Sound Mixing for a Series, Outstanding Sound Editing for a Series. The show was also nominated for the Golden Globe Award for Best Television Series – Drama.

Episodes 

The number in the "No. in series" column refers to the episode's number within the overall series, whereas the number in the "No. in season" column refers to the episode's number within this particular season. "Featured character(s)" refers to the character(s) whose back story is featured in the episode's flashbacks. "U.S. viewers (million)" refers to the number of viewers in the United States in millions who watched the episode as it was aired.

Home media release 
Lost: The Complete First Season was released as a widescreen seven-disc Region 1 DVD box set on September 6, 2005, two weeks before the premiere of the second season. It was distributed by Walt Disney Studios Home Entertainment. In addition to all the episodes that had aired, it included several DVD extras such as episode commentaries, behind-the-scenes footage and making-of features as well as deleted scenes, deleted flashback scenarios and a blooper reel. The season was subsequently released on Blu-ray Disc on June 16, 2009.

The same set was released on November 30, 2005, in Region 4, and on January 16, 2006, in the United Kingdom. For the region 2 release, the season was split into two releases, with part 1 (episodes 1–12) released on October 31, 2005, and part 2 (episodes 13–25) and the complete season set on January 16, 2006.

References

External links 

List of Lost season 1 episodes at Lostpedia

Lost (TV series)
2004 American television seasons
2005 American television seasons